This is a list of mayors of North Bay, Ontario. The mayor presides over North Bay City Council.

Mayors
John Bourke (first mayor, 1891)
William McKenzie (1892-1893)
Richard Bunyan (1894)
Dr J.B. Carruthers (1895)
Michael Brennan (1896)
Thomas N. Colgan (1897-1898)
J.M. McNamara (1899-1900)
J.G. Cormack (1901)
J. W. Richardson (1902)
William McKenzie (1903-1904)
David Purvis (1905-1906)
Wm Milne (1907-1908)
Robert Rankin (1909-1910)
G.A. McGaughey (1911-1912)
George Lee (1913-1914)
James McIlvenna (1915-1916)
T.J. Patton (1917-1918)
John Ferguson (1919-1922)
John McDonald (1923-1925)
D Barker (1926-1927)
E.L. Banner (1928-1929)
Robert Rowe (1930-1931)
J.W. Richardson (1932-1933)
W.G. Bullbrook (1934-1936)
Robert Rowe (1937-1938)
Arthur Beattie (1939-1940)
C.R. Harrison (1941-1942)
D.G. Stevens (1943)
W.F. Stones (1944-1946)
J.L. Shaw (1947)
Ced Price (1948-1949)
T.M. Palmer (1950-1951)
Arthur Beattie (1952-1953)
Merle Dickerson (1954-1960)
Cecil Hewitt (1961-1965)
Merle Dickerson (1966-1971)
Bruce Goulet (1972-1973)
Merle Dickerson (1974-1980)
Jack Smylie (1980-1982)
Merle Dickerson (1982-1984)
Stan Lawlor (1984-1994)
Jack Burrows (1994-2003)
Vic Fedeli (2003 - November 30, 2010)
Al McDonald (December 1, 2010 - present)
Peter Chirico (2022, elect)

References

North Bay, Ontario